Merja Kiviranta (born 1 October 1977) is a Finnish former racing cyclist. She finished in second place in the Finnish National Road Race Championships in 2009. She also competed at the 2005 ITU Triathlon World Championships.

References

External links

1977 births
Living people
Finnish female cyclists
Finnish female triathletes
Place of birth missing (living people)